Elections to North Tyneside Metropolitan Council took place on 5 May 2011 on the same day as other council elections in England and the UK AV referendum.

North Tyneside Council is elected "in thirds" which means one councillor from each three-member ward is elected each year with a fourth year when the mayoral election takes place.

One third of the councillors were elected in 2007. The Labour Party gained 6 seats, and lost none. giving them an overall majority of councillors. The Conservative Party remain in control however as the mayor continues to be Linda Arkley. Arkley now has to seek the support of other parties to get her budget passed as the Conservatives lost 5 seats and the 20 seats required to pass such legislature. The Liberal Democrats also lost one seat for the second consecutive year. Labour won 14 seats in 2010 and 2011 combined, with the Conservative losing 12, switching the balance of power in the council chamber.

Battle Hill

Benton

Camperdown

Chirton

Collingwood

Cullercoats

Howdon

Killingworth

Longbenton

Monkseaton North

Monkseaton South

Northumberland

Preston

Riverside

St Mary's

Tynemouth

Valley

Wallsend

Weetslade

Whitley Bay

2011
2012
21st century in Tyne and Wear